The Church of Conscious Living is an Australian anti-vaccination organisation founded in 2015. It was established by anti-vaccinationist Stephanie Messenger and promoted by the Australian Vaccination Network in order to exploit an exemption in the Australian "No Jab, No Play" policy for publicly supported childcare and play schemes, where unvaccinated children cannot be enrolled in childcare, but parents with religious objections are excepted.

The NSW Government and the media have described the Church of Conscious Living as a "fake" or "sham" church, and mainstream churches have denounced it as the "cult of anti-vaccine".

The Church of Conscious Living is not registered as a church or charity with the Australian federal government's Charities and Not-for-profits Commission; it is instead registered as a for-profit business.

According to the Sydney Morning Herald:

Virologist David Hawkes described the group as a "devious sham", and investigation by the Telegraph found that no real church in Australia had any doctrinal objection to vaccination. It was denounced as "a scam" by NSW opposition health spokesman Andrew McDonald. 

McDonald specifically identified the Church of Conscious Living, describing "spurious religious exemptions" as being open to abuse and exploitation in the legislation as then (May 2013) proposed, saying: "Today, sadly, we have already seen an attempt by the Australian Vaccination Network—it should be called the Australian anti-vaccination network—to exploit the loophole in these new vaccination laws by encouraging their supporters to join the Church of Conscious Living and avoid the New South Wales Government's vaccination legislation". Minister for Health Jillian Skinner noted that the "church" was promoted by the Australian Vaccination Network, and commented that recent changes to legislation permitted the Health Care Complaints Commission to scrutinise this activity.

Tony Abbott pledged, as federal opposition leader, to restrict religious exemptions to "clear religious reasons" and as Prime Minister in April 2015 he announced that family and childcare payments worth thousands of dollars per year would be stripped from vaccine refusers unless supported by a religious exemption formally approved by the Government.

References

External links
Official website, archived by Wayback Machine.

Anti-vaccination organizations
Conspiracy theorists